Axar Rajeshbhai Patel, also spelled as Akshar Patel, (born 20 January 1994) is an Indian international cricketer who plays for the Indian cricket team in all formats of the game as a bowling All-rounder. He also plays for Gujarat in domestic cricket and for the Delhi Capitals in the Indian Premier League. He is a left-handed batter and slow left-arm orthodox bowler.

He made his ODI debut on 15 June 2014 against Bangladesh. He was selected in India's 15-man squad for the 2015 Cricket World Cup held in Australia and New Zealand. He made his Test debut for India against England on 13 February 2021, where he took 7 wickets. He became the ninth bowler for India to take a five-wicket haul on debut in Test cricket. He is best known for his consistent wicket taking ability in Test cricket.

Domestic career
In his second first-class match, against Delhi in November 2013, Patel took 6 for 55 in the first innings. This was his first five-wicket haul.

Patel played just one first-class game in his debut season for Gujarat, but had a more successful showing in 2013. Slotted primarily as a bowling allrounder, the left-arm spinner got his first IPL contract with Mumbai Indians ahead of IPL 2013, although he was on the bench for the entire season.

He was one of the key contributors to India Under-23s' title win in the 2013 ACC Emerging Teams Cup, with seven wickets, including a four-for in the semi-final against UAE.
He was one of the consistent performers for Gujarat in the 2013/14 Ranji Trophy, finishing the season with 369 runs at an average of 46.12 and 29 wickets at 23.58. In early 2014, he was named the BCCI Under-19 cricketer of the year for the 2012/13 season.

In August 2019, he was named in the India Red team's squad for the 2019–20 Duleep Trophy. In October 2019, he was named in India C's squad for the 2019–20 Deodhar Trophy.

IPL career
Patel was signed up by the IPL franchise Mumbai Indians in 2013 but did not get a chance to play until he was released. He was then picked up by Kings XI Punjab in 2014 and had an impressive season with 17 wickets. He was retained by the Kings XI Punjab for the 2015 IPL season. Batting lower down the order, he scored 206 runs for the Kings XI Punjab in 2015 in addition to taking 13 wickets. On 1 May 2016, during a match against the Gujarat Lions, he took four wickets in five balls, including the first (and only) hat-trick of the 2016 IPL season, to pave the way for Kings XI Punjab's 23-run win against table-toppers Gujarat Lions in Rajkot. He was retained by Kings XI Punjab for the 2018 season.

Axar Patel became the 9th Indian player to take a five-wicket haul on Test debut and only the second left-arm spinner after Dilip Doshi to take a five-for in his debut Test.

In December 2018, he was signed up by the Delhi Capitals in the player auction for the 2019 Indian Premier League. He was retained by Delhi capitals for the 2021 season.

International career

After excellent performance in the 2014 IPL, Patel was rewarded with a place in the Indian ODI squad for the tour to Bangladesh and made his ODI debut in the first match of series at Sher-e-Bangla National Stadium and took 1/59 runs. He was part of India's 15-man squad for the 2015 Cricket World Cup.

He made his Twenty20 International debut for India against Zimbabwe on 17 July 2015. He was named as a stand-by player for India's squad for the 2019 Cricket World Cup.

In January 2021, Patel was named in India's Test squad for their series against England. He made his Test debut against England on 13 February 2021 and made his comeback in international cricket after a gap of almost three years. His first international Test wicket was of Joe Root. In the same match, he took a five wicket haul in England's second innings, becoming the ninth Indian bowler to do so on debut. In the 3 matches he played in his debut series, he took 27 wickets at a mere average of 10.59, finishing as the second-highest wicket taker of the series. Later in the year, he scored his maiden Test half-century against New Zealand.

In September 2021, Patel was named in India's squad for the 2021 ICC Men's T20 World Cup. However, on 13 October 2021, he was replaced by Shardul Thakur in India's squad.

In November 2021, Patel was named in India's squad for New Zealand's tour of India in 2021.

In June 2022, Patel was named in India's squad for their T20I series against Ireland.

On 25 July 2022, Patel scored his maiden ODI half-century against West Indies. He scored 64 runs off 35 balls, and remained unbeaten as he scored a match-winning six.

On 5 January 2023, Axar Patel scored his maden T20 half-century against Srilanka. He scored a stunning 65 runs off 31 balls, which includes 6 Sixes and 3 Fours. Axar Patel hits a hat-trick of Sixes to Srilanka's best spinner Hasaranga. He become the 3rd Indian Batsman to have highest strike rate while scoring a maiden Half-century in T20 cricket.

Personal life 
He married Meha Patel on 26 January 2023 in Vadodara, Gujarat.

Awards
BCCI Under-19 cricketer of the Year 2014.
Emerging Player of the Tournament in 2014 IPL

References

External links

1994 births
Living people
People from Anand district
Indian cricketers
India Test cricketers
India One Day International cricketers
India Twenty20 International cricketers
Gujarat cricketers
Mumbai Indians cricketers
Punjab Kings cricketers
Cricketers at the 2015 Cricket World Cup
Gujarati people
People from Nadiad
Indian A cricketers
Dharamsinh Desai University alumni
Cricketers who have taken five wickets on Test debut
Delhi Capitals cricketers